Pierre Lagaillarde (Courbevoie, 15 May 1931 – 17 August 2014) was a French politician, and a founder of the Organisation armée secrète (OAS).

Lagaillarde was a lawyer at Blida in Algeria, a reserve officer of the paratroopers, and an elected deputy of Algiers. He took the presidency of the Association générale des étudiants d'Alger (General Association of Alger's Students) in 1957, and also took part in the Alger insurrection of May 1958, which brought Charles de Gaulle back to power. Lagaillarde was member of the Comité de salut public which opposed  Algerian independence, and occupied the Gouvernement général de l'Algérie (local colonial administration). In November 1958, he was on the electoral list Algérie française (French Algeria), and then became a leader of the insurrection during the week of the barricades in January 1960.

Lagaillarde was then detained in la Santé in Paris, and took advantage of his parole to escape to Spain (along with Jean-Jacques Susini, Jean-Maurice Demarquet, Marcel Ronda and Fernand Féral Lefevre), where he joined Raoul Salan and founded the OAS on 3 December 1960. Deprived of his immunity as a deputy, he was sentenced in absentia to ten years of prison in March 1961.

In October 1961, he was arrested in Madrid, along with the Italian neofascist Guido Giannettini. The Spanish dictator, Francisco Franco, later exiled Lagaillarde to the Canary Islands.

Lagaillarde was pardoned by France through the 1968 amnesty law.

References

External links 
 A picture of Pierre Lagaillarde
 Another picture (ref ALG-58-226-R44 on the monument first level left in battle dress) (ECPAD)
 Decision of the national assembly

1931 births
2014 deaths
People from Courbevoie
Politicians from Île-de-France
Deputies of the 1st National Assembly of the French Fifth Republic
Members of the Organisation armée secrète
Far-right politicians in France
People of the Algerian War
Recipients of French presidential pardons